Lesperance, or Lespérance, is a surname. It may refer to:

Lesperance
David Lesperance, United States Army major general
Ellen Lesperance (born 1971), American artist and educator, known for her paintings
Matt Lesperance (born 1987), American wheelchair basketball player
Pete Lesperance, Canadian musician and producer

Lespérance
Sylvie Lespérance (1954–2006), Canadian politician from Quebec
Zotique Lespérance (1910–2006), Canadian sportswriter

See also
L'Esperance